Li Huifen (born October 14, 1963) is a Chinese table tennis player. She won a silver medal in the 1988 Seoul Olympic Games in women's singles.

She also won two English Open titles.

In her 15-year athletic career, she won a total of 37 gold medals, 16 silver and 16 bronze.

She is now the Hong Kong women's table tennis team coach. Her husband Hui Jun is also a table tennis player-coach.

References

External links
 Profile at the International Table Tennis Federation

Chinese female table tennis players
Olympic silver medalists for China
1963 births
Living people
Olympic medalists in table tennis
Table tennis players from Shijiazhuang
Medalists at the 1988 Summer Olympics
Olympic table tennis players of China
Table tennis players at the 1988 Summer Olympics
20th-century Chinese women